Steinunn Sigurðardóttir is an Icelandic fashion designer. She is the founder and creative director of the label STEiNUNN, founded in 2000.

Early life 
Steinunn was born in Reykjavik, Iceland.

In a 2006 interview at Sjónþingi Gerðubergs, Steinunn talks about the influence her mother and grandmother had on her early life and how it shaped her professional career. Steinunn’s grandmother worked as a seamstress and frequently made clothes for Steinunn. She taught Steinunn how to knit at the age of 9 but knitwear design has been very predominant in Steinunn’s collections. Steinunn also credits her mother’s great sense of style. She recalls a particular dress her mother used to wear which Steinunn eventually inherited. The dress became an iconic part of Steinunn's wardrobe and later in her career inspired a design for a Calvin Klein dress, which walked the runway in 1992.

After finishing her studies in Reykjavík, Steinunn moved to New York City to attend Parsons School of Design. Steinunn was the first Icelandic person to attend Parsons School of Design.

When she arrived in New York she recalls having to grow up very fast in such a fast-paced city. Her knitting skills came of good use; within a month and a half she had gotten a job as a pattern sample knitter which allowed her to earn extra money to cover the expense of living in New York City.

Despite having been told she would never get into a design school by her teachers back home in Iceland, Steinunn graduated in 1986 from Parsons with a Bachelor in Fashion Design (BFA), with honours.

Career 
Upon her graduation in 1986, Steinunn spent a brief year working with Carmelo Pomodoro as an assistant designer. The two had met during her studies at Parsons. In 1987 to 1989 she worked as a designer for Polo/Ralph Lauren Collection.

In 1989 she got the opportunity to design for Calvin Klein. The two began a close relationship and Steinunn quickly moved on to become the Director and Senior Knitwear Designer for Calvin Klein Inc., Collection, CK Sport, and Jeans Division. At Calvin Klein she continued experimenting with knitwear. Her signature design became cable knit, which gave her the nickname "The Cable Queen" at the Calving Klein house. Later on during her work at Calvin Klein she began experimenting with knit as fabric. She manipulated the material and discovered new techniques to create a different feel and texture.

In one year Steinunn recalls designing twelve clothing lines, worked on six different fashion shows, travelled three times to Hong Kong, twice to San Francisco, twice to Italy, and three times to Iceland. It was the year she truly got to know the insanity behind the fashion industry.

Steinunn left Calvin Klein Inc. in 1995 and began working as the Director and Senior Designer for Gucci Group. She was with Gucci Group until the year 2000.

In 2000, Steinunn became the Creative Director of La Perla Ready to Wear. Steinunn sought a lot of her inspiration from her native country Iceland, and its nature. She began experimenting with sheer fabrics and silk to bring out texture that reminded her of freshly fallen snow. Steinunn also started playing with fish skin in her designs which at the time was unheard of. Steinunn was the main advocate for starting a swimsuit line for La Perla. She recalls having to fight for her vision, but once she got what she wanted La Perla gained a lot of attention for its swimwear.

STEiNUNN 
The same year that she started her work as Creative Director at La Perla Steinunn withdrew $10,000 from her savings account and started her own fashion label STEiNUNN back in Iceland.  She left her position at La Perla in 2003 to focus solely on her own brand and other personal projects. After a hugely successful and challenging career abroad Steinunn felt it the biggest challenge yet was to become and independent designer and create something that reflects purely her personal vision. In an interview she said the goal as a designer is to constantly push her creative practice further and bring it to the next level.

In November 2011 Steinunn relocated her store to 17 Grandagardur, located in the fish-packing district of Reykjavik. Steinunn re-designed a building which used to be a small repair workshop for fishnets, but kept the authentic rustic charm. The original floors, left untouched, tell the story of the space.

Awards and honours 

Steinunn received the prestigious Söderberg Prize from the Rhösska museum in 2008 

Other awards and honours:
 2011 "Indriði Award" Icelandic Fashion Council, first time recipient
 2009 Reykjavík City Artist 2009, Reykjavik City, Iceland, first time designer recipient
 2008 Söderberg  Prize, Winner of the Torsten and Wanja Söderberg Prize, Gothenburg, Sweden, first time fashion design recipient 
 2008 Myndstef Award, Nomination, Reykjavík, Iceland
 2008 FKA – The Icelandic Association of Women Entrepreneurs Award, Reykjavík, Iceland
 2007 Winner of "Ginen 2007", Nordic fashion awards.
 2007 Awarded by the President of Iceland the "Knight´s Cross" of "The Order of the Falcon" first time designer recipient
 2006 Icelandic Visual Art Award, Nomination
 2006 Saga Fur Workshop, Copenhagen
 2003 "Designer of the Year" award in Iceland, "Menningarverðlaun"
 2000 Finalist in Enkamania Design Talent 
 1986 Adri Gold Thimble Award
 1986 Norman Norell Scholarship
 1985 Norman Norell Scholarship
 1985 Carmelo Pomodoro Silver Thimble Award
 1985 Designer of the Future, Knitted Textiles Association

Exhibitions 
Steinunn has held numerous lectures, set on solo and group exhibitions as well as curated exhibitions in Iceland and abroad. She has served on boards of numerous companies and organisations, and frequently teaches as a guest teacher in design schools around the world.

Her works have been acquired by museums in Iceland, Sweden, and Norway.

In 2013 Steinunn introduced Rhythm Knitting as a part of the Nordic Cool 2013 festival organised by the Kennedy Centre. "Steinunn Sigurd presented a hands-on workshop celebrating the cultural and artistic value of knitting. From novice to expert, participants of all skill levels were introduced to new possibilities in knitting, using music and creative techniques without needles that found the participants using only their fingers."

Selected exhibitions 

Selected solo exhibitions 

 2016 Rhythm Knitting light Installation, Harpa Music Hall, Reykjavík, Iceland
 2014 Rhythm Knitting light Installation, L8ight Festival, Aberdeen, Scotland
 2011 "Upbeat" Gallery 751D Beijing, China
 2010 "Nordic Light House, World Expo, Shanghai, China
 2009 "Steinunn" Kjarvalstaðir, Reykjavík Art Museum, Iceland.
 2008 "STEiNUNN" Rhösska Design Museum, Söderberg, Gothenburg.
 2006 "Fortíð – Nútíð" Textil Museum, Blöndós, Iceland.
 2006 "Retrospective", Nordatlantesbrygge Copenhagen.
 2006 "Sjónþing - a retrospective", Gallery Gerðuberg, Reykjavik

Selected group exhibitions

 2016 "Weather Diaries" Nordic Fashion Biennale Royal, Nordic House, Rvk, Iceland.
 2015 "Weather Diaries" Nordic Fashion Biennale Royal, Coda Museum Holland.
 2015 "Weather Diaries" Nordic Fashion Biennale Royal, Nordic House, Faroe Islands.
 2014 "Weather Diaries" Nordic Fashion Biennale Royal Library, Copenhagen DK.
 2014 "Weather Diaries" Nordic Fashion Biennale Royal, Frankfurt Design Museum.
 2013 "Nordic Design" Design Museum Iceland.
 2013 "Nordic Cool" Kennedy Art Center for Performing Arts, Washington DC, USA.
 2012 "Nordic Design" Vandalorum Design Museum, Sweden.
 2011 "Looking Back", Nordic Fashion Biennale, Nordic Museum, Seattle.
 2011 "On the Cutting Edge" Museum for Applied Art, Frankfurt.
 2010 "STEiNUNN" Upbeat, Gallery 751D Beijing, China
 2010 "STEiNUNN" Nordic Light House, World Expo, Shanghai
 2009 "Code" Belle Center Copenhagen, Denmark
 2009 "Nordic Fashion Biennale" Nordic House, Reykjavík, Iceland
 2007 "Iceland Cometh", Meatpacking District, ICFF, Gallery, NY NY.
 2007 "Icelandic Fashion & Design", Nordic Embassies, Berlin
 2006 "Icelandic Fashion", National Centre for Cultural Heritage, Reykjavik
 2006 "Mode and Design Aus Islande" National Centre for Cultural Heritage, RVK.
 2006 "Retrospective", Nordatlantesbrygge Copenhagen
 2006 "Sjónþing - a retrospective", Gallery Gerðuberg, Reykjavik
 2006 "Fashion & Design", The Museum of Applied Art, Cologne
 2005 "Icelandic culture", Stockholm’s Auktionsverk.
 2005 "World Expo 2005" World Fair Tokyo, Japan
 2004 "Nordic cool", National Museum of Women in the Arts, Washington, USA.
 2002 Museum of Modern Art, Barcelona 
 2002 "5 X 5 Nordic Design", Stockholm Design show

Curator

 2013 "Silver" National Museum of Iceland w/Páll Hjaltason
 2012 "Fingramál", Icelandic Design Museum
 2012 "Tízka" / "Fashion", National Museum of Iceland
 2010 "World Expo 2010 " Iceland Pavilion Shanghai, curated w/Páll Hjaltason, Finnbogi Péturs, Ámundi Sigurðs, Saga Film.
 2005 "Ómur, National Museum of Iceland, curated w/Páll Hjaltason
 2004 "Transforme", Gallery Marel, Reykjavík, curated w/Páll Hjaltason
 2004 "Transforme" VIA Gallery, Paris, curated w/Páll Hjaltason

Works in public collections 

 2009 Hönnunarsafn Íslands, Design Museum of Iceland.
 2009 Rhösska Design Museum, Söderberg Priz, Göthenborg.
 2009 Museum of Decorative Arts and Design, Oslo, Norway

Lectures 

 2016 "Rhythm Knitting" Nordic House, Reykjavík, Iceland 
 2014 "Rhythm Knitting" Aberdeen, Scotland
 2014 "Rhythm Knitting" Royal Library Copenhagen, Denmark
 2014 "Rhythm Knitting" Boras School of Textiles, Sweden
 2014 STEiNUNN, Boras School of Textiles, Sweden
 2014 "Rhythm Knitting" Nordic House, Faroe Islands.
 2014 "Rhythm Knitting" Frankfurt Design Museum, Germany
 2014 Women in Parliament, Harpa Music Hall, Reykjavík, Iceland
 2014 STEiNUNN, Alaska Art Museum, Anchorage, Alaska
 2014 "Rhythm Knitting" National Gallery, Anchorage, Alaska
 2014 STEiNUNN, Juneau City Hall, Alaska
 2014 STEiNUNN, Fairbanks Museum, Alaska
 2013 University of Reykjavík, MBA Business program, Reykjavík Iceland
 2013 HDK Gothenburg Design School, Sweden
 2013 Private Design School, Gothenburg, Sweden
 2013 FISOS, Association of Icelandic Museums, National Heritage Museum
 2013 "Rhythm Knitting " Nordic House Nuuk, Greenland
 2013 "Rhythm Knitting " Kennedy Art Center for Performing Arts, Washington DC, USA
 2012 Fashion gowns and corsilet, National Museum of Iceland.
 2011 Íslandsstofa, Icelandic Trade Council,
 2011 "Looking Back to find our Future", Nordic Fashion Biennale, Nordic Museum, Seattle, USA.
 2011 "Thinking Hands" National Museum of Iceland, Reykjavík Art School
 2010 Beijing Fashion Institute of Technology, Beijing China
 2009 University of Iceland, Reykjavík Iceland
 2009 Nordic Council of Ministers, Kultur Forum, Felleshus - Nordic Embassies, Berlin, Germany
 2009 CCP, Reykjavík Art Museum
 2009 Lava 2009, Seminar, Iðnó, Reykjavík, Iceland
 2009 Confederation of the Icelandic Employment (Santök Atvinnulífsins), Reykjavík, Iceland
 2009 Innovation Conference, Nýsköpunarþing, Reykjavík, Iceland
 2009 Verkmenntaskólinn á Akureyri, Ísland
 2009 "Nordic Fashion Biennale" Nordic House, Reykjavík, Iceland
 2009 Iðnskólinn í Hafnarfirði, Ísland
 2009 Art teachers in Iceland, Listmenntakennarar á Íslandi
 2008 Rhösska Design Museum Gothenborg, Söderberg Priz, Gothenburg, Sweden.
 2008 National Museum of Iceland, Norrænir safnverðir, Reykjavík
 2008 FIT, New York Panel Discussion, New York, USA
 2008 FIT, New York Fashion Design Students, New York, USA
 2007 Skt. Petersburg Fashion Students, Nordic House, Iceland
 2007 FIT, New York, Fashion Design Gallery, New York, USA
 2007 Design Center, Klaus K., Helsinki Finland,
 2007 "Icelandic Fashion & Design", Nordic Embassies, Berlin, Germany.
 2006 Design students, Reykjavík Art School, Reykjavík, Iceland
 2006 "Scandinavian House" Aalands Island, Finland
 2006 "Retrospective", Nordatlantesbrygge Copenhagen
 2006 "Fortíð – Nútíð" Textile Museum, Blöndósi,
 2006 "Sjónþing - a retrospective", Gallery Gerðuberg, Reykjavik
 2005 Fashion Students, LHI, Icelandic Academy of art, Reykjavík, Iceland
 2004 "Nordic cool", National Museum of Women in the Arts, Washington, USA.
 2004 WorkshopmNational Museum of Women in the Arts, Washington, USA.
 2004 "Nordic design" The Scandinavian House, Reykjavík, Iceland

References 

Living people
Year of birth missing (living people)
Steinunn Sigurdardottir
Steinunn Sigurdardottir
Parsons School of Design alumni